Deprez Basin is a nearly circular basin on the Ingrid Christensen Coast of Princess Elizabeth Land in East Antarctica.

Location 
The basin is located at Latitude 68° 30′ 15.8″ S, Longitude 78° 12′ 09.4″ E is a circular body of water connected to Long Fjord, in the Vestfold Hills on the Ingrid Christensen Coast of Princess Elizabeth Land. It is adjacent to Partizan Island near Long Peninsula. There is a connection between the basin and Long Fjord that is only about 40 m wide and not very deep. During the winter, there is a lot more ice on the surface of the basin than on the nearby fjord. This suggests that there is little or no water exchange between the two bodies of water during the winter. The basin has a diameter of about 400 m and a maximum depth of about 13 m. At the surface, the salinity of the water is about 50 g/L, which is above seawater. At a depth of 13 m, the salinity is about 120 g/L. The fact that its water becomes oxygen-free below 6 m shows that it is stratified. According to research, it has been divided into groups since at least 1991. Because of this, it is called meromictic. So, the basin is like other meromictic bodies of water in the Vestfold Hills, like Lake Burton (Antarctica) and Bayly Basin, which are also in the same area. These bodies of water are always stratified, but they still have a seasonal link to fjords and the ocean.

Naming 
The Antarctic Names Committee of Australia named the basin in 1995 after a chemical limnologist Patrick Deprez, who had been part of the 1984 winter expedition at Davis Station.

Further reading 

 Gibson, J.A. (2001) Areas of Lakes in the Vestfold Hills, Ver. 1, Australian Antarctic Data Centre - doi:10.26179/5d686ee160ee9, Accessed: 2022-05-10

References 

Antarctic Peninsula
Meromictic lakes